The following is a list of all aerospace models produced by Beechcraft since its inception in 1932.

Model Numbers

 Model 16 – Single-engined, all-metal training aircraft
 Model 17 Staggerwing – Single-radial-engined fabric-covered biplane utility aircraft, tailwheel landing gear
 Model 18 Twin Beech – Twin-radial-engined all-metal utility aircraft, tailwheel landing gear
 Model 19 Musketeer Sport – Lower-powered trainer developed from Model 23, rear seat optional, fixed tricycle landing gear
 Model 23 Musketeer/Custom/Sundowner – Single-engined all-metal utility aircraft, fixed tricycle landing gear
 Model 24 Super/Sierra – Higher-powered development of Model 23; Super R and Sierra have retractable landing gear
 Model 25 – Prototype twin-engined trainer entered production as the Model 26
 Model 26 Wichita – Twin-engined trainer built primarily of wood
 Model 28 Grizzly – Prototype twin-engined attack aircraft
 Model 33 Debonair/Bonanza – Development of Model 35 with conventional tail, initially marketed as Debonair, rebranded as Bonanza in 1968
 Model 34 Twin-Quad – Prototype small airliner; the largest aircraft ever built by Beechcraft
 Model 35 Bonanza – Single-engined utility aircraft, retractable tricycle landing gear, V-tail
 Model 36 Bonanza – Lengthened development of Model 33 with conventional tail
 Model 38P Lightning – Experimental turboprop utility aircraft.
 Model 40 – Twin-engined Bonanza, only one produced, two engines driving one propeller
 Model 45 Mentor – Tandem two-seat single-engined military trainer produced for U.S. military as T-34
 Model 46 - Twin-engined trainer for the United States Air Force as T-36A, program canceled, prototype built but not flown
 Model 50 Twin Bonanza – Twin-engined utility aircraft; despite its name, it is mostly a new design using only a few Bonanza subassemblies
 Model 55 Baron – Twin-engined high-performance utility aircraft; derived from the Model 95 Travel Air
 Model 56 Baron – Turbocharged variant of the Model 55
 Model 58 Baron – Lengthened development of Model 55 with dual rear passenger doors; pressurization offered
 Model 60 Duke – Twin-engined high-performance utility aircraft
 Model 65 Queen Air – Twin-engined transport aircraft; derived from the Model 50 Twin Bonanza
 Model 70 Queen Air – Twin-engined transport aircraft; derived from the Model 65
 Model 73 Jet Mentor – Prototype for two-seat tandem jet trainer
 Model 76 Duchess – Twin-engined four-seat trainer developed from Model 24 Sierra with new T-tail
 Model 77 Skipper – Single-engined two-seat primary trainer with fixed tricycle landing gear
 Model 79 Queen Airliner - Variant of the Model A65 for regional airlines, not built
 Model 80 Queen Air – Twin-engined transport aircraft; Model 65 with swept tail
 Model 87 - One Model A80 with turboprop engines.
 Model 88 Queen Air – Twin-engined transport aircraft; Model 80 with pressurised 10-seat cabin
 Model 89 Queen Airliner - Variant of the Model A80 for regional airlines, not built
 Model 90 King Air – Twin-turboprop-engined transport aircraft, developed from the Queen Air 88
 Model 95 Travel Air – Twin-engine development of the Model 35 Bonanza using Model 45 Mentor tail; more closely related to Bonanza than similarly named Twin Bonanza
 Model 99 Airliner – Twin-turboprop-engined small airliner; derived from the Queen Air 80
 Model 100 King Air – Twin-turboprop-engined transport aircraft, developed from the King Air 90
 Model 112 - 1957 twin-turboprop project - not built
 Model 115 - 85% size concept prototype for the Model 2000
 Model 120 - 1962 twin-turboprop project - not built  
 Model 200 Super King Air – Development of the King Air 100
 Model 220 Denali - Single-turboprop high-performance utility aircraft
 Model 300 Super King Air – Development of the King Air 200
 Model 390 Premier – Twin-turbofan-engined utility aircraft
 Model 400 Beechjet – Twin-turbofan-engined utility aircraft, originally designed and manufactured by Mitsubishi
 Model 1001 - Target drone produced for U.S. military as AQM-39
 Model 1019 - Target drone produced for U.S. military as AQM-37
 Model 1025 - Drone later MQM-25
 Model 1074 Pave Eagle - Drone variant of the Model 33 Bonanza for use by the U.S. military as the QU-22A
 Model 1079 Pave Eagle II - Drone variant of the Model 36 Bonanza for use by the U.S. military as the QU-22B
 Model 1300 - Proposed 13-seat commuter variant of the Model 200, not built
 Model 1900 Airliner – Twin-turboprop-engined airliner development of Model 200 Super King Air
 Model 2000 Starship – Twin-turboprop-engined utility aircraft with canard configuration and pusher propellers
 Model 3000 Texan II - Military turboprop trainer

Project Design Numbers
 PD.208 - Prototype for the Model 99
 PD.289 - Became the Model 76 Duchess
 PD.290 King Air 400 - Experimental conversion of a King Air 200.

United States military designations

British military designations
Expeditor - Model 18 (C-45)
Traveller - Model 17 (C-43/GB)

Canadian military designations
CT-134 Musketeer – Model 23
CT-145 Super King Air – Model 200
CT-156 Harvard II – Model 3000

Other products 

 Beechcraft Plainsman – Post-World War II automobile that reached the prototype stage before being cancelled
 Beechcraft AQM-37 Jayhawk – Air-launched target drone aircraft with a single rocket engine
 Beechcraft MQM-61A Cardinal – Drone aircraft with a single horizontally-opposed two-stroke piston engine and propeller
 Beechcraft MQM-107 Streaker – Unmanned target drone aircraft

Notes

References

Beechcraft aircraft
Beechcraft